Lysmata pederseni is a species of saltwater shrimp first classified as Lysmata wurdemanni. It is found in shallow waters of the Atlantic Ocean, and can be distinguished by its coloration pattern and its association with tube sponges.

References

Further reading
Baeza, J. Antonio. "The symbiotic lifestyle and its evolutionary consequences: social monogamy and sex allocation in the hermaphroditic shrimp Lysmata pederseni." Naturwissenschaften 97.8 (2010): 729-741.
Baeza, J. Antonio, et al. "Molecular phylogeny of shrimps from the genus Lysmata (Caridea: Hippolytidae): the evolutionary origins of protandric simultaneous hermaphroditism and social monogamy." Biological Journal of the Linnean Society 96.2 (2009): 415-424.
Rhyne, Andrew L., and Arthur Anker. "Lysmata rafa, a new species of peppermint shrimp (Crustacea, Caridea, Hippolytidae) from the subtropical western Atlantic." Helgoland Marine Research 61.4 (2007): 291-296.
Baeza, J. Antonio. "Molecular systematics of peppermint and cleaner shrimps: phylogeny and taxonomy of the genera Lysmata and Exhippolysmata (Crustacea: Caridea: Hippolytidae)." Zoological Journal of the Linnean Society160.2 (2010): 254-265.

External links

WORMS

Alpheoidea
Crustaceans described in 2006